Foreign U-boats was the title for a special section created by Nazi Germany's Kriegsmarine that adopted 13 captured enemy submarines and a single Turkish vessel into the U-boat corps. Beginning in 1939 and lasting until the end of World War II in 1945, the Kriegsmarine modified a total of 13 captured enemy submarines, then deployed them into combat with German crews. The special corps was not especially successful, as only ten enemy ships were destroyed by Foreign U-boats through the entire war. However, some were effective as minelayers.

The captured submarines
: ex Turkish submarine Batiray
UB: ex British submarine 
UC-1: ex Norwegian submarine HNoMS B-5
UC-2: ex Norwegian submarine HNoMS B-6
UD-1: ex Dutch submarine 
UD-2: ex Dutch submarine 
UD-3: ex Dutch submarine 
UD-4: ex Dutch submarine 
UD-5: ex Dutch submarine 
UF-1: ex 
UF-2: ex 
UF-3: ex 
UIT-22: ex Italian submarine 
UIT-23: ex Italian submarine Reginaldo Giuliani
UIT-24: ex 
UIT-25: ex

See also
 Yanagi missions of the Imperial Japanese Navy in World War II to European waters
 List of IJN World War II submarines, including non-Japanese submarines in IJN service

References

Submarines of the Kriegsmarine
Military history of Germany during World War II
U-boats